This is a timeline of Burundian history, comprising important legal and territorial changes and political events in Burundi and its predecessor states.  To read about the background to these events, see History of Burundi.  See also the list of Kings of Burundi, list of colonial governors of Burundi, and list of presidents of Burundi.

19th century

20th century

21st century

See also
 Timeline of Bujumbura

References

General

Specific

Sources

Further reading
  
 
 

Burundian
Years in Burundi
Timeline